Patrick Yeboah (born 16 March 1994) is a Ghanaian footballer who plays as a defender forGolden Threads FC and Ghana.

Club career
In July 2019, Asante Kotoko signed Yeboah on a three-year contract from Karela United.

International career
On 20 October 2019, Yeboah made his debut for Ghana in a 0–0 draw against Burkina Faso.

References

1994 births
Living people
Footballers from Kumasi
Association football defenders
Ghanaian footballers
Ghana international footballers
Karela United FC players
Asante Kotoko S.C. players
Real Tamale United players